The Tehuacán Valley matorral is a xeric shrubland ecoregion, of the deserts and xeric shrublands biome, located in eastern Central Mexico.

Matorral is a Spanish  word, along with tomillares, for shrubland, thicket or bushes.  The term is used alone for a Mediterranean climate ecosystem in Southern Europe.

Geography
The Tehuacán Valley matorral ecoregion occupies the Tehuacán Valley, Oriental Basin, and  adjacent valleys, covering parts of the states of Tlaxcala, Puebla and Oaxaca. The valleys lie in the rain shadow of the surrounding mountain ranges, and are drier than the surrounding ecoregions.

Adjacent ecoregions
The Tehuacán Valley matorral is bounded by the Trans-Mexican Volcanic Belt pine-oak forests to the northwest, north, and northeast, the Sierra Madre de Oaxaca pine-oak forests to the east, and by the Balsas dry forests to the southeast, south, and southwest.

Flora

The Tehuacán Valley matorral is a center of plant diversity, with over 2700 species, of which approximately 30% are endemic. It is a center of diversity for species of Agave, Hechtia, Salvia, and cactus.

The ecoregion has a number of distinct plant communities.

Fauna
The ecoregion is notable for its diversity of birds and bats. Of the 90 species of birds present, 10 are endemic, including the ocellated thrasher (Toxostoma ocellatum), and bridled sparrow (Aimorphilla mystacalis). 34 species of bats inhabit the ecoregion, of which 18 are endangered, vulnerable, or rare.

Protected areas
A 2017 assessment found that 1,594 km², or 16%, of the ecoregion is in protected areas. Protected areas include the Tehuacán-Cuicatlán Biosphere Reserve.

See also
 List of ecoregions in Mexico
 Matorral

References

Valiente-Banuet, Alfonso, Noe Flores-Hernandez, Miguel Verdu, Patricia Davila. "The chaparral vegetation in Mexico under nonmediterranean climate: the convergence and Madrean-Tethyan hypotheses reconsidered". American Journal of Botany, 1998 85: 1398-1408.

External links
 
 
 Tehuacán-Cuicatlán Biosphere Reserve (ParksWatch) [PDF]

Deserts and xeric shrublands
Deserts of Mexico
Ecoregions of Mexico
 
 
 
 
Neotropical ecoregions